Smartt is an unincorporated community in Warren County, Tennessee, United States. Smartt has a post office with ZIP code 37378.

References

Unincorporated communities in Warren County, Tennessee
Unincorporated communities in Tennessee